Xanthoxenite is a rare calcium iron(III) phosphate mineral with formula: Ca4Fe3+2(PO4)4(OH)2·3H2O. It occurs as earthy pale to brownish yellow incrustations and lath shaped crystals. It crystallizes in the triclinic crystal system. It occurs as an alteration product of triphylite in pegmatites. It occurs associated with apatite, whitlockite, childrenite–eosphorite, laueite, strunzite, stewartite, mitridatite, amblygonite and siderite.

It has been found in Australia, Brazil, Portugal, Spain, Ukraine, and the United States.  It was first described in 1920 for an occurrence in North Groton, Grafton County, New Hampshire.

References 

Phosphate minerals
Triclinic minerals
Minerals in space group 2